Cymindis bushirica is a species of ground beetle in the subfamily Harpalinae. It was described by Jedlicka in 1948.

References

bushirica
Beetles described in 1948